Oliver Glasner (born 28 August 1974) is an Austrian professional football coach, currently as a head coach of  Eintracht Frankfurt. In his playing career, he played as a defender for Austrian Football Bundesliga side SV Ried.

Playing career 

Glasner started his career at SV Riedau, and joined the second Austrian division team SV Ried in 1993. Ried got promoted to the Austrian Bundesliga in 1995. During the  he won the Austrian Cup with the club. When Ried went down to second division again in 2003, Glasner joined First League team LASK for the next season, but returned to Ried a year later. Ried returned to the Bundesliga in 2005, and in the 2010–11 season, Glasner won the Austrian Cup for the second time. On 31 July 2011, he suffered a cut above the eye and a slight concussion during a header duel in a league match between Ried and Rapid Wien. Nevertheless, he accompanied his team during the Europa League third qualifying round second leg against Brøndby IF. After the final head ball training session, a brain haemorrhage developed on August 4, 2011. He was operated on the same day. Glasner survived the operation well, but ended his career on the advice of the doctors on August 23, 2011. He made more than 500 league appearances in his 16-year career.

Coaching career

Beginnings in Salzburg and Ried 
In 2006, Glasner completed Diplomkaufmann at University of Hagen. He was offered an assistant coach role at Ried in 2012. But Peter Vogl, then honorary president of SV Ried and CEO of Red Bull Salzburg, hired Glasner as management assistant, responsible for sports coo. Glasner asked Ralf Rangnick for an opportunity in coaching, and in July 2012, he became assistant coach for Roger Schmidt in the first-team squad. After the successful 2 year spell at Salzburg, he was appointed as a head coach of his former club SV Ried for the 2014–15 season. He started the campaign with two wins: 3–2 against Parndorf in the first round of the Austrian Cup, on 11 July 2014; and 3–1 against Wiener Neustädter in a league match, on 19 July.

LASK 
Glasner joined LASK in the 2015–16 season as a director of sport, and coach. He helped the team earn promotion to the first division in his second season. LASK finished the 2017–18 Austrian Football Bundesliga season in fourth position, earning a place in the 2018–19 Europa League third qualifying round. It was club's first European campaign since 2000. In the 2018–19 season, LASK  finished in second place, just behind perennial champions Red Bull Salzburg, which allowed them to participate in the UEFA Champions League third qualifying round. Following his success with LASK, Jörg Schmadtke hired Glasner to manage VfL Wolfsburg in the Bundesliga, and Valérien Ismaël joined LASK as his replacement.

Vfl Wolfsburg 
In his first season with Wolfsburg, the club managed to qualify for the Europa League, finishing 7th in the league. Glasner also guided them to the Europa League round of 16 phase, where they lost 5–1 on aggregate against Shakhtar Donetsk. In the 2020–21 Bundesliga, Wolfsburg finished fourth, qualifying for the UEFA Champions League.

Eintracht Frankfurt 
In May 2021, Eintracht Frankfurt announced that Glasner had signed on as head coach on a three-year deal until 30 June 2024. The start at Frankfurt was challenging. Eintracht appointed Axel Hellmann as the new chairman of the board, Markus Krösche succeeded Fredi Bobic as managing director for sport, Ben Manga replaced Bruno Hübner as sporting director, and the team lost its top scorer, André Silva, to RB Leipzig. Glasner also lost 2–0 in the first round of DFB-Pokal against third tier Waldhof Mannheim. Frankfurt was close to the relegation zone in November. They managed to win only one league game during the first months – against Bayern Munich at the Allianz Arena. It was the first time after 21 years, and after 16 matches they did so.  

Between November and December, the team gained points in a few matches, winning six out of seven, and was placed 6th at the end of Hinrunde. The second half of the season was inconsistent though, as Frankfurt couldn't leave the middle of the table, and finished the league at 11th place. On the other hand, their continental campaign was successful. They advanced to the Europa League final, for the third time in the club's history (after 1960 and 1980) – defeating Barcelona and West Ham en route – and won the match 5–4 on penalties against Scottish club Rangers, staying undefeated for 13 UEL games.

Managerial statistics

Honours

Manager
Eintracht Frankfurt
UEFA Europa League: 2021–22

References

External links

1974 births
Living people
People from Schärding District
Footballers from Upper Austria
Austrian footballers
Association football central defenders
SV Ried players
LASK players
2. Liga (Austria) players
Austrian Football Bundesliga players
SV Ried managers
LASK managers
VfL Wolfsburg managers
Eintracht Frankfurt managers
Austrian Football Bundesliga managers
Bundesliga managers
UEFA Europa League winning managers
Austrian expatriate football managers
Austrian expatriate sportspeople in Germany
Expatriate football managers in Germany
University of Hagen alumni